Dvinia is an extinct genus of cynodonts found in the Salarevo Formation of Sokolki on the Northern Dvina River near Kotlas in Arkhangelsk Oblast, Russia. It is the only known member of the family Dviniidae. Its fossil remains date from the Late Permian and were found with Inostrancevia, Scutosaurus and Vivaxosaurus.

Dvinia was a small omnivore possessing a large temporal opening typical of advanced therapsids, with a thin postorbital bar separating the eye from the muscle attachment. As a cynodont, it was closely related to mammals. The dentition consisted of a set of small incisors followed by 2 canines and 10-14 postcanines.

See also 
 List of therapsids

References

Further reading 
 Patricia Vickers-Rich and Thomas H. Rich, The Great Russian Dinosaurs, Guntar Graphics, 1993, pg.41

External links
Dvinia skull model and illustrations
Procynosuchidae 
Palaeos Vertebrates: Cynodontia: Basal Cynodontia
 Mikko's Phylogeny Archive Cynodontia – cynodonts

Prehistoric cynodont genera
Lopingian synapsids of Europe
Permian Russia
Fossils of Russia
Fossil taxa described in 1922
Taxa named by Vladimir Prokhorovich Amalitskii